Un Soir de Joie (French)  is a Belgian comic film directed by Gaston Schoukens and released in 1955.
The film's plot takes place in German-occupied Belgium during World War II, and focuses on the so-called Faux Soir, a satirical version of the German controlled newspaper Le Soir produced by the resistance.

The film includes extensive footage of Brussels in the 1950s, where it was filmed on location.

Marcel Roels, Roger Dutoit, Jean-Pierre Loriot, Victor Guyau, Madeleine Rivière, Jacques Philippet, Francine Vendel all acted in the film.

Plot 
Based on a true story from November 1943: the Resistance manages to publish a fake edition of the pro-German newspaper 'Le Soir', put on sale by surprise in the newsstands and stuffed full of parodic articles pouring ridicule upon occupying forces. The film faithfully traced the course of this humorous and enterprising attempt to wake up the populace, filling out the basic plot with irreverent patriotic gags.

References

Citations

External links
La Deux – « Un Soir de joie » at Le Soir (archive)

Belgian comedy films
1955 comedy films
1955 films
Films set in 1943
Films about newspaper publishing
World War II films based on actual events
Western Front of World War II films
Films shot in Brussels
Films set in Brussels
Belgian black-and-white films